Oastler Lake Provincial Park is a provincial park in the municipality of Seguin, Parry Sound District in Central Ontario, Canada. The nearest town, just to the northwest, is Parry Sound.

Oastler Lake is a recreation-class park, 32 hectares (79 acres) in size, on the shore of Oastler Lake where the Boyne River flows in from Otter Lake. It is located along a former alignment of Highway 69 which now has the street name Oastler Park Drive.

References

External links
 

Provincial parks of Ontario
Parks in Parry Sound District
Protected areas established in 1990
1990 establishments in Ontario